Dmitriy Alekseyevich Kosov (born 28 September 1968 in Vladivostok) is a retired Russian sprinter who specialised in the 400 metres. He competed at the 1992 and 1996 Summer Olympics. In addition, he won two medals at the 1995 Summer Universiade.

His personal bests in the event are 45.53 seconds outdoors (Moscow 1995) and 46.60 seconds indoors (Moscow 1993).

Competition record

References

External links 
All-Athletics profile

1968 births
Living people
Sportspeople from Vladivostok
Russian male sprinters
Olympic male sprinters
Olympic athletes of Russia
Olympic athletes of the Unified Team
Athletes (track and field) at the 1992 Summer Olympics
Athletes (track and field) at the 1996 Summer Olympics
Goodwill Games medalists in athletics
Competitors at the 1994 Goodwill Games
Universiade medalists in athletics (track and field)
Universiade silver medalists for Russia
Universiade bronze medalists for Russia
Medalists at the 1995 Summer Universiade
World Athletics Championships athletes for Russia
Russian Athletics Championships winners
CIS Athletics Championships winners